Corbett Hospital is a National Health Service (NHS) hospital run by the Dudley Group NHS Foundation Trust located in Amblecote, Stourbridge, West Midlands, England. The current hospital is an out-patient centre which opened on 25 May 2007 in a ceremony conducted by Tony Blair as part of his farewell tour before resigning as Prime Minister.

History

The Old Hospital
The old hospital had its origins in a seven-bedroom mansion was known as The Hill, the home of George Mills, a glass manufacturer who was a partner in the Albert Glass House situated in Wordsley. He committed suicide on 13 November 1885 after several years of mental illness. He left debts of £11,344-12s-6d, and even though the house was in a poor state of repair it was eventually sold to pay of the liabilities.

John Corbett, who spent his youth living at the Delph, made his fortune producing salt at Stoke Prior, Worcestershire and, perhaps remembering his youth, purchased the rather rundown house in December 1891. He repaired and refurbished the house, changing its use into a hospital, and endowed it to the local people on 31 July 1893, with a sum of £2,000 for endowment.

The Corbett Hospital Preliminary Training School was opened in 1948 on the formation of the National Health Service, providing accommodation for 12 medical students.

Accident and emergency unit
An accident and emergency unit was opened in 1964, but closed 20 years later following the opening of a new unit at Russells Hall Hospital.

As recently as the late 1990s, there was widespread local campaigning for the return of accident and emergency facilities at the Corbett, on the grounds that such a facility there would have reduced the waiting time for people around Stourbridge needing the service.

The original Corbett Hospital closed in 2005 after 112 years in use. The new building is situated within the grounds of the original one, which was demolished in late 2007.

References

External links
Dudley Group NHS Foundation Trust

Hospital buildings completed in 1893
NHS hospitals in England
Stourbridge